Eastern Galicia is a geographical region in Western Ukraine (present day oblasts of Lviv, Ivano-Frankivsk and Ternopil), having also essential historic importance in Poland.

Galicia was formed within the Austrian Empire during the years 1772–1918. Eastern Galicia, now includes all of the Lviv and Ivano-Frankivsk Oblasts (regions) of Ukraine as well as Ternopil Oblast, with its northern strip bordering the former Kremenets, Shumsk and Lanivtsi Raions and the northern part of Zbarazh Raion. On the other hand, the western part of Eastern Galicia is located in Poland (the eastern part of the Subcarpathian Voivodeship - Przemyśl, Sanok, Jarosław, Lubaczów, Lesko and Bieszczady and the areas around these cities and places. A tiny piece of Eastern Galicia is also located in the Lublin Voivodeship - the town of Lubycza Królewska and the surrounding area, but Tomaszów Lubelski, 15 km away, is no longer part of Galicia, nor did it belong to the Austrian state during the partitions of Poland. It was part of Congress Poland within the Russian Empire as per the Russian partition of Poland. The area of Eastern Galicia is about 46,800 km2 (18,100 sq miles).

History 
In 1918, Western Galicia became a part of the restored Republic of Poland, which absorbed part of the Lemko region. The local Ukrainian population declared the independence of Eastern Galicia as the West Ukrainian People's Republic. The predominantly-Polish population of Lviv (Lwów, Lemberg) resisted, which led to the Polish-Ukrainian War during which the Poles took control of all of Galicia. In a pact with Poland, Herman Petyura of the Ukrainian People's Republic ceded Eastern Galicia in exchange for help against the Soviets. During the Polish–Soviet War, the Soviets established in July 1920 in Eastern Galicia the short-lived Galician Soviet Socialist Republic.

The Peace of Riga of 18 March 1921 assigned the contested Eastern Galicia to the Second Polish Republic. The Entente powers recognized the Polish possession of the territory on 14 March 1923.  

The Ukrainians of the former Eastern Galicia and the neighbouring province of Volhynia made up about 12% of the population of the Second Polish Republic and were its largest minority. As the Polish government's policies were unfriendly towards minorities, tensions between the Polish government and the Ukrainian population grew, which eventually gave the rise to the militant underground Organization of Ukrainian Nationalists.

Etymology 
The name Galicia, or Halychyna in Ukrainian, is derived from the city of Halych (Latin Galic) which was the first capital of the Galician principality. The name Halych in turn derives from the Ukrainian word halka which means "crow", which is reflected by the crow at the center of the city's early modern coat of arms.

Many also believe that the name Halych/Galic (and from it Halychyna/Galizia) is derived from the Greek word ἅλς (hals), meaning "salt". The Byzantines and the Greeks had a strong influence on these lands and it was from the Greeks that Galicia and Kievan Rus' were converted to Christianity. In fact the Greek word for salt pit is αλυκή (alyki), which makes a strong argument that Halych could be an alteration of that. Halych was rich in salt, which was mined in the region. During the early medieval period, salt was Halych's main export. Today, however, there is no more salt mining in Halych.

Bibliography 
 Encyclopedia of Ukraine
 Small Dictionary of History of Ukraine

See also 
Galicia (Eastern Europe)
West Galicia
Russian occupation of Eastern Galicia, 1914–15 
 Jewish–Ukrainian relations in Eastern Galicia
Red Ruthenia
District of Galicia
Lwów Voivodeship
Ruthenian Voivodeship

References

Notes 

 Eastern